Colinas may refer to:

People
 Antonio Colinas (born 1946), Spanish writer
 Julen Colinas (born 1988), Spanish footballer

Places
Brazil
 Colinas, Maranhão
 Colinas, Rio Grande do Sul
 Colinas do Tocantins
 Colinas do Sul, Goiás

Spain
 Colinas del Campo de Martín Moro Toledano

See also
  Las Colinas